The Tuyamuyun Hydro Complex (THC) is a system of four interconnected reservoirs and a series of canals on the lower Amu Darya River, bordering Uzbekistan and Turkmenistan. Its primary purpose is to provide water for irrigation in Xorazm, Karakalpakstan and Daşoguz regions of Uzbekistan, Turkmenistan and as far north as Kazakhstan. It was constructed between 1969 and 1983. Aside from irrigation, the complex also provides water for industrial and municipal uses. A 150 MW power station on the main dam contains six 25 MW hydroelectric turbine-generators.

The main dam (THC Main Dam) is located on the Amu Darya, straddling the border of Uzbekistan and Turkmenistan. It is the center-piece of the complex. Water from the Channel Reservoir can be fed into the adjacent Kaparas and Sultansanjar Reservoirs for later use. The Sultansanjar Reservoir is connected via a canal to the Koshbulak Reservoir which lies just east. A system of canals off the main dam supply a network of irrigation canals to the various regions for irrigation.

References

Dams in Uzbekistan
Dams in Turkmenistan
Gravity dams
Hydroelectric power stations in Uzbekistan
Hydroelectric power stations in Turkmenistan
Dams completed in 1983
Energy infrastructure completed in 1983
1983 establishments in Uzbekistan
1983 establishments in Turkmenistan
Xorazm Region
Lebap Region
Hydroelectric power stations built in the Soviet Union
Dams in the Aral Sea basin